KH-5 ARGON was a series of reconnaissance satellites produced by the United States from February 1961 to August 1964. The KH-5 operated similarly to the CORONA series of satellites, as it ejected a canister of photographic film. At least 12 missions were attempted, but at least 7 resulted in failure. The satellite was manufactured by Lockheed. Launches used Thor-Agena launch vehicles flying from Vandenberg Air Force Base, with the payload being integrated into the Agena.

Payload 
At least two missions deployed ELINT subsatellites. The onboard camera had a focal length of 76 mm. The purpose of the system, which produced relatively low-resolution images compared to other spy satellites, was to provide imagery for cartography purposes. This was one of the tasks that had originally been planned for the SAMOS series of satellites equipped with the (quickly cancelled) E-4 cameras. Each satellite took photographs for less than a week before returning its film.

The satellite was in use during the same period as the KH-2 to KH-4A CORONA and the KH-6 LANYARD satellites. Later satellites were the KH-4B and KH-7 GAMBIT. Images from three of the successful missions returned the first images of Antarctica from space.

Satellites 
Discoverer 20 (KH-5 9014A), was a USAF photographic reconnaissance satellite under the supervision of the National Reconnaissance Office (NRO). Discoverer 20 was the first KH-5 ARGON satellite to be launched. The launch occurred at 20:24:00 GMT on 17 February 1961. A Thor DM-21 Agena-B launch vehicle was used, flying from LC 75-3-4 at the Vandenberg Air Force Base. It was assigned the Harvard designation 1961 Epsilon 1. Images were recorded onto 127 mm film, and were to have been returned in a Satellite Recovery Vehicle (SRV) before the satellite ceased operations. Recovery of the capsule was not attempted due to a system malfunction, and thus the scientific experiment data obtained were limited. Discoverer 20 decayed on 28 July 1962.

Launches

See also 

 KH-1 thru KH-4B CORONA
 KH-6 LANYARD
 KH-7 GAMBIT-1
 KH-8 GAMBIT-3
 KH-9 HEXAGON or Big Bird
 KH-10 DORIAN or Manned Orbital Laboratory
 KH-11
 Satellite imagery
 Cold War

References 

 Mark Wade (August 9, 2003) KH-5 Encyclopedia Astronautica
 KH-5 ARGON GlobalSecurity.org

Surveillance
Reconnaissance satellites of the United States
Military equipment introduced in the 1960s